The 1988–89 Buffalo Sabres season, the team's 19th season of existence, saw the Sabres finish in third place in the Adams Division with a record of 38 wins, 35 losses, and 7 ties for 83 points. They lost the Division Semi-finals in five games to the Boston Bruins.

Regular season

Clint Malarchuk incident

On March 22, 1989, a horrific incident occurred during a game between the Sabres and the St. Louis Blues at the Buffalo Memorial Auditorium, when Buffalo goaltender Clint Malarchuk had his jugular vein severed by the skate blade of the Blues' Steve Tuttle during a goal mouth collision. According to reports, eleven fans in the stands fainted, two more had heart attacks, and three players vomited on the ice. The Sabres' training staff was immediately on the scene, and Malarchuk eventually needed 300 stitches to close the wound. Malarchuk spent only one night in the hospital before returning to practice four days later and was back on the ice within 10 days.

Season standings

Schedule and results

Playoffs

Division semi-finals
1989 Stanley Cup playoffs
Buffalo Sabres vs. Boston Bruins

Boston wins best-of-seven series 4 games to 1

Player statistics

Forwards
Note: GP = Games played; G = Goals; A = Assists; Pts = Points; PIM = Penalties in minutes

Defencemen
Note: GP = Games played; G = Goals; A = Assists; Pts = Points; PIM = Penalties in minutes

Goaltending
Note: GP = Games played; W = Wins; L = Losses; T = Ties; SO = Shutouts; GAA = Goals against average

Awards and records

Transactions

Draft picks
Buffalo's draft picks at the 1988 NHL Entry Draft held at the Montreal Forum in Montreal, Quebec.

Farm teams

References

Buffalo Sabres seasons
Buffalo
Buffalo
Buffalo
Buffalo